David Licht (born 20th century in Detroit, Michigan) is a drummer and a founding member of the Grammy Award-winning American Klezmer band The Klezmatics. He moved to New York City in 1985 to help manage a recording studio, joined the band Bongwater, and later met Frank London with whom he started The Klezmatics.  He also played with When People Were Shorter and Lived Near the Water.

References 
http://www.allmusic.com/artist/bongwater-mn0000085723
http://www.allmusic.com/artist/david-licht-mn0000131094

Year of birth missing (living people)
20th-century births
American male drummers
Bongwater (band) members
Living people
Musicians from Detroit
Musicians from New York City
B.A.L.L. members
Shockabilly members
20th-century American drummers
21st-century American drummers
20th-century American male musicians
21st-century American male musicians
The Klezmatics members
When People Were Shorter and Lived Near the Water members